Carolien Aimee Salomons (born 20 July 1974) is a former Dutch international cricketer whose career for the Dutch national side spanned from 1995 to 2011. She played for the Netherlands at both the 1997 and 2000 World Cups, and served as the team's captain between 2001 and 2006.

References

External links

1974 births
Dutch women cricket captains
Dutch women cricketers
Living people
Netherlands women One Day International cricketers
Netherlands women Test cricketers
Netherlands women Twenty20 International cricketers
Sportspeople from Amsterdam
20th-century Dutch women
20th-century Dutch people
21st-century Dutch women